Solime Bertrand (December 12, 1827 – February 10, 1891) was a notary and political figure in Quebec, Canada. He represented Rouville in the Legislative Assembly of Quebec from 1878 to 1879 as a Conservative.

Bertrand was born in Saint-Mathias, Lower Canada to Paul Bertrand (also a Notary) and Agathe Vigeant, and was educated at the Collège de Chambly. He qualified as a Notary in 1849. In 1854, he married Marie-Louise-Hermine Demers. He served as president of the Agricultural Society for Rouville Regional County Municipality, Quebec, secretary for the municipality of Saint-Mathias and as a member and secretary-treasurer for the school board. His election in 1878 was overturned in 1879 for reasons undetermined. Bertrand died in Saint-Mathias at the age of 63.

References
 

1827 births
1891 deaths
Conservative Party of Quebec MNAs